The Naafkopf is a mountain in the Rätikon range of the Alps, located at the border between Austria, Liechtenstein and Switzerland.

References

External links 

 Naafkopf on Hikr

Mountains of the Alps
Mountains of Graubünden
Mountains of Vorarlberg
Mountains of Liechtenstein
Austria–Liechtenstein border
Austria–Switzerland border
Liechtenstein–Switzerland border
Schaan
Maienfeld
International mountains of Europe
Border tripoints
Mountains of Switzerland
Two-thousanders of Switzerland